Arthur Canfield Wheeler (August 26, 1856 – October 5, 1941) was a two-term Republican mayor of Norwalk, Connecticut from 1895 to 1896. He was a manufacturer of straw hats for over thirty years.

Early life and family 
He was born in Norwalk in August 1856 and attended public schools. He was the son of Charles H. Wheeler, and Anna Eliza Canfield Wheeler. He graduated at age 14. He soon thereafter joined John P. Beatty & Company, manufacturers of straw hats. On June 23, 1880, he married Susie Cousins. In September 1888, Wheeler took possession of the factory at 13 Butler Street, where he expanded the business and employed over 200 workers. He engaged in the hat manufacturing business until 1919. He conducted the Braid and Novelty Company until his death.

Political career 
When the Borough of Norwalk was first incorporated as a city in 1893, he was a member of the first City Council. He served on the City Council in 1888, 1894, and 1895. In 1895, he was elected mayor.

In 1902, he was a member of the Norwalk School Board, president of Hour Publishing Company, the publisher of the Norwalk Hour, and a member of the board of directors of the Fairfield County Savings Bank.

Associations 
Freemasons:
Member (1884), St. John's Number 6 Masons; Worshipful Master (1894–1896); Grand Master of Connecticut (1902)
Member and High Priest, Washington Chapter of Norwalk Number 24
Knight (1891), Commander (1897), Clinton Commandery Number 3
32nd Degree Member, Lafayette Consistory, S.P.R.S., A.A.S.R. of Bridgeport
Member, Pyramid Temple of the Mystic Shrine of Bridgeport
Grand Patriarch, Odd Fellow of Connecticut
Member, Norwalk Club
Member, Algonquin Club of Bridgeport
Member, Norwalk Kiwanis Club
Member, Everyman's Bible Class
Norwalk Braid Club

References 

1856 births
1941 deaths
American Episcopalians
Masonic Grand Masters
Connecticut city council members
Connecticut Republicans
American milliners
Mayors of Norwalk, Connecticut